Ashutosh Ramnarayan Neekhra (born 10 November 1967), known professionally as Ashutosh Rana, is an Indian actor, producer, author and television personality. He has worked in Marathi, Telugu, Kannada, Tamil, and Hindi films. He has also worked in Indian television shows. He has also won two Filmfare Awards for Dushman and Sangharsh. He won these awards in the category Filmfare Awards in a negative role. He is known for his portrayal of negative roles.

Besides being an actor, he is also an author, a philanthropist. Some of the books written by him are 'Maun Muskaan Ki Maar' and 'Ramrajya'.

Early and personal life
Rana was born on 10 November 1967. He is from Gadarwara, Narsinghpur Madhya Pradesh. He also spent some time Kasindra city of Ahmedabad district, Gujarat state. He spent his childhood in Gadarwara, Narsinghpur district of Madhya Pradesh where he finished his primary school. He had done his graduation form Dr. Hari Singh Gaur University Sagar Madhya Pradesh. He used to play the role of Ravana in the local Ramleela productions. He is cousin of Rameshwar Neekhra, two times MP of Narmadapuram (Lok Sabha constituency) and state vice president of Indian National Congress.

He went to the National School of Drama, New Delhi and studied acting. He has done many plays with Satyadev Dubey in Prithvi Theatre.

Rana is married to Renuka Shahane also a Bollywood actress. They have two sons, Shauryaman and Satyendra.

Career

Television
Rana started his career with the television serial Swabhimaan, followed by serials like Farz, Sazish, Jax Kabhi, Waris and anchoring the TV show, Baazi Kiski. He also hosted Sarkaar Ki Duniya, a reality show which took place on Mango Island in Karwar, Karnataka. Later, in 2010, he had acted in a Star Plus show Kaali- Ek Agnipariksha, where he played a negative role as Thakral. He had also played lead role in famous TV serial of Doordarshan, named Apradhi Koun.

Films
Rana became known in Indian Cinema after his movie Dushman, where he played a cold blooded psychopathic killer. He is mostly given roles of antagonists in movies, particularly that of a killer. And in some movies he played supporting roles. He has acted in South Indian films. He frequently appears in Mahesh Bhatt's films. He played the role of Alia Bhatt's father in Karan Johar's Humpty Sharma Ki Dulhania.

He has acted in many Kannada films. He has shared screen space with South Indian Super Star Vishnuvardhan, a star of 220 movies in five different languages. He acted in the Kannada film Vishnu Vijaya, starring Akshay Kumar. He also acted with Vishnuvardhan in the 2005-released super hit film Vishnu Sena, and the 2007 released movie Kshana Kshana that also starred Aditya and Prema.

Filmography

Hindi films

Telugu films
Venky (2004) as Yogendra Kumar Sharma
Bangaram (2006) as Bhooma Reddy
Okka Magadu (2008) as Namboodriyar
Victory (2008) as MLA K. Devraj
Balupu (2013) as Poorna
Tadakha (2013) as Bagga
Pataas (2015) as G.K.
Courier Boy Kalyan (2015) 
Krishnashtami (2016)
Nene Raju Nene Mantri (2017) as Subbarayudu
Jai Simha (2018) as Thota Rami Reddy
Saakshyam (2018) as Munuswamy's 2nd brother
Viswamitra (2019) as A. Rana
Kalki (2019) as Narsappa

Tamil films
Vettai (2012) As Annachi
Meaghamann (2014) King Jothi
Tamilselvanum Thaniyar Anjalum (2016) Arun
Motta Shiva Ketta Shiva (2017) G.K
Johnny (2018) Ram
Sangathamizhan (2019) Kulandaivel
Maaligai (2021)

Kannada films
 Vishnu Sena (2005)
 Kshana Kshana (2007) as Rana
 Avatara Purusha (2022) as Darka

Marathi films
Sankasur (2013)... Marathi Movie
Yeda (2013 Film )... Marathi Movie

Host
Sarkaar Ki Duniya (2009)
Baazi Kiski (2001)
Savdhaan India (2019 – present)

Television
Tehkikaat (1994) Episode 21 to 23 A Mystery Behind Sleep Walking Disorder as Shyam
Swabhimaan (1995) as Tyagi
Aahat (1995) Episode 1 The Closed Room, Episode 12 to 15 Explosion as Avinash
X-Zone (1998-2000) Episode 47
Saturday Suspense (1997-1999) as Inspector Raghuraj
Waris (1999)
Farz (2001)
Kaali- Ek Agnipariksha (2010)
Saazish 
Kabhi Kabhi 
Dhundh 
Apradhi Kaun? as Inspector Gaurav Gambhir
Chhatrasal (2021) as Aurangzeb
Aranyak (2021) as Mahadev Dogra
The Great Indian Murder (2022) as Jagganath Rai
Khakee: The Bihar Chapter (2022) as IG Mukteshwar Chaubey IPS

Awards
Screen Awards
1999 Won Screen Award for Best Actor in a Negative Role for Dushman

Zee Cine Awards
1999 Won Zee Cine Award for Best Villain for Dushman.
2000 Won Zee Cine Award for Best Villain for Sangharsh.

Filmfare Best Villain Award
 1999: Won Dushman
 2000: Won Sangharsh

South Indian International Movie Awards 
 2014: Nominated- SIIMA Award for Best Actor in a Negative Role (Telugu)-Tadakha
 2021: Won - 2021 Filmfare OTT Awards for Best Supporting Actor in a Web Original Film Pagglait.

References

External links 

 Pathaan at Bollywood Hungama
 

Indian male stage actors
Indian male television actors
Living people
Male actors from Madhya Pradesh
National School of Drama alumni
Male actors in Hindi cinema
20th-century Indian male actors
21st-century Indian male actors
People from Narsinghpur district
1967 births
Filmfare Awards winners
Screen Awards winners
Zee Cine Awards winners